Gehlenbeck is a village in the East Westphalian borough of Lübbecke in the county of Minden-Lübbecke in North Germany. The former clustered village (Haufendorf) is the second most populous village today in the borough. A stream flows through the village, the Gehle Beke (High German: gelber Bach; English: "Yellow Brook"), that once gave its name to the village. The village's parish has an area of around 11 km2. With 297 inhabitants per km2 Gehlenbeck is rather less densely settled than the borough of Lübbecke (398 people/km2).

References

Literature 
 Werner Fabis: Gehlenbeck - Ein Dorf im Spiegel der Geschichte. Herausgeber: Heimatverein Gehlenbeck e. V.

External links 
Internet presence of the town of Lübbecke
Gehrmker Hius - Heimathaus Gehlenbeck

Minden-Lübbecke
Lübbecke
Wiehen Hills